CFRA is a news/talk formatted radio station in Ottawa, Ontario, Canada, owned by Bell Media. The station broadcasts on the assigned frequency of  580 kHz. CFRA's studios are located in the Bell Media Building on George Street in Downtown Ottawa's ByWard Market, while its 4-tower transmitter array is located near Manotick.

History
Frank Ryan founded the station, which began broadcasting with a 1,000-watt transmitter at 560 kHz on May 3, 1947. The first studios were located at the Ottawa Auditorium on O'Connor Street, where the station spent its first ten years. In 1962, the station moved to its current frequency of 580 kHz and increased its daytime power to 50 kW, and nighttime power to 10 kW.

After Ryan's death in 1965, ownership of the station passed to his wife Kathleen, who subsequently sold CFRA and sister station CFMO-FM to CHUM Limited in 1968.

Between 1980 and 1984, on Saturday afternoons from 2 to 5pm, CFRA aired an oldies show hosted by American announcer and comedian Gary Owens, formerly of the Rowan & Martin's Laugh-In TV show. it was entitled Soundtrack Of The Sixties, where song requests were offered by postcard to the station as an entry towards the yearly-end prize.

CFRA played pop music until the mid-1980s as Ottawa's leading Top 40 music station, known in the late '70s and early '80s for its hugely popular and controversial evening host Mark Elliot. So popular was Elliott at his peak that he was tapped to be a presenter at the Juno Awards in 1985. Much of Elliott's wildness on the air could be attributed to the fact that he was suffering from drug and alcohol addictions at the time. One of Elliott's most eyebrow-raising behaviors came in 1986 when he quit on the air  after a switch to an oldies-based format (see below) was announced. After a short time at competitor CFGO (where his addictions and erratic behaviour cost him his job), Elliott went into rehab and managed to kick his addictions; he later became the host of a talk show for people recovering from addictions on Toronto radio.

On August 18, 1986, CFRA changed formats to "Favourites of Yesterday and Today," describing itself as a gold-based adult contemporary station (and mirroring a similar change from Top 40 to gold-based AC that same year at sister station CHUM in Toronto). In 1991, CFRA changed the format again to an all-oldies station, before changing to the current news/talk format in June 1993. Many believe that CJMJ-FM's launch in 1991 (co-owned with CFRA since 1999) led to the demise of CFRA's adult contemporary format. In 2002, CFRA's slogan became "left on the dial, right on the issues", as a tribute to its conservative talk political leanings. The current studios have been located at CHUM's downtown Market Media Mall since 2000. In 2007, CFRA, along with the other CHUM stations, were sold to CTVglobemedia.

In January 2012, Bell Media applied to increase nighttime power to 30 kW noting that co-channel stations in Antigonish (CJFX-FM), Baie-Comeau (CHLC-FM) and Thunder Bay (CKPR-FM) have all switched to FM. On September 26, 2012, Bell Media's application received CRTC approval to increase CFRA's night-time power from 10 to 30 kW and by modifying its antenna pattern (improving reception towards Montreal), resulting in changes to its authorized contours. All other technical parameters would remain unchanged. CFRA would remain on 580 kHz.

Programming
Notable personalities include Bill Carroll and Evan Solomon

Newsroom staff is made up of anchors/producers, Ted Raymond, Zach McGibbon, Dylan Dyson, and Sara Cimetta. Most weekday newscasts are read by CTV's Graham Richardson, Trisha Owens, and Matt Skube.

CFRA also broadcasts syndicated talk radio shows such as Coast to Coast AM and Viewpoints with Todd van der Heyden overnight and on weekends. Since April 2012, the audio feed of CTV affiliate and sister television station CJOH-DT's 6 PM newscast is simulcast on CFRA.

Lowell Green CBSC complaints
A complaint against Lowell Green was launched in 2008 after a provocative show on December 4, 2008 about the Muslim faith. The topic began with Green speaking about a school which had named a teddy bear Muhammad. Green then led a discussion on whether the Muslim faith was radical and violent. Lowell himself took the view that it was radical and violent at its core. The complaint to the Canadian Broadcast Standards Council (CBSC) was launched in December 2008. The CBSC responded that no standards had been broken and there was no obligation for Green to be uncritical of the topic at hand.

The Ontario Regional Panel of the CBSC reviewed the case again after the complainant reiterated his points and did not accept the original decision. Then CBSC then decided that the December 4th Lowell Green show had violated clause 2 (Human Rights) and clause 6 (Full, Fair and Proper Presentation) of the CBSC code of ethics.

A previous complaint had been made to the CBSC in 2006 after a May 18 episode in which Green spoke about the Muslim faith and the Qur'an.

Both complaints resulted in CFRA not being obligated to agree with the complainant but to respond to the complainant in a timely and thorough manner. A response was written by the news director but ultimately, the complainant was not satisfied with the result. The complaint was then sent to the adjudicating panel of the CBSC but no further action was required.

Notable staff
 Ernie Calcutt (1961 to 1984), Ottawa Rough Riders commentator and news director

References

External links
 580 CFRA
 CFRA's 60th Anniversary website 1947-2007
 
 

Fra
Fra
Fra
Radio stations established in 1947
1947 establishments in Ontario